Laxmanrao Sardessai (1904-1986) was a Goan poet and short-story writer. Considered one of the territory's finest writers in the Marathi language, he also wrote prose and verse in Konkani and Portuguese.

Sardessai was born in 1904, in Savoi-Verem, and died in 1986. He lived, therefore, through the times of the Portuguese First Republic, the Estado Novo dictatorship and, after 1961, the post-Liberation Indian government. His writings, which include over 700 stories in Marathi, provide a spectrum of Goa over the twentieth century.

Bibliography 

 Thali, Prakash. Laxmanrao Sardessai. New Delhi: Sahitya Akademi, 2008.

External links 
Examples of his poetry in Portuguese may be found here:
Sou Querido de Todos (1966)
Ouço os Teus Passos, Senhor (1966)
O Poeta (1966)
Não Estou Só, Não! (1966)
A Causa que Eu Professo (1966)
Paredes (1966)
Eu Canto a Sua Glória (1966)
A Ave de Rapina (1966)
O Inferno (1966)
Delhi (1966)
Nas Mãos de Deus (1966)
Conflagração (1966)
Sou Quem Sou (1966)
Estou em Tudo (1966)
Delícias do Paraíso (1965)
Sempre Alegres (1965)
Momentos (1965)
A Vida (1965)
Ideias e Rupias (1965)
Dia de Independência
Bonança (1965)
Um conflito (1965)
Alforreca (1965)
O Teu Maior Inimigo (1965)
O Nosso Crime (1965)
Eu Quero (1965)
Eu Idealizo (1965)
Os Meus Sonhos (1965)
Esperança (1965)
Nossos Heróis (1964)

Marathi-language poets
Portuguese-language writers
1904 births
1986 deaths
Poets from Goa
Indian male poets
Recipients of the Sahitya Akademi Award in Konkani
Konkani-language poets
20th-century Indian poets
20th-century Indian male writers